Roscommon County is a county located in the U.S. state of Michigan. As of the 2020 Census, the population was 23,459. The county seat is Roscommon. The county was founded in 1840 and organized in 1875.

History

The county was formed by the Michigan Legislature in 1840 as Mikenauk County, then renamed Roscommon County in 1843. It was administered by Michilimackinac (Mackinac), Cheboygan, and Midland counties, in succession, prior to the organization of county government in 1875. Roscommon County was named after County Roscommon, Ireland.

There are three official Michigan historical markers in the county:
 Gerrish
 Pioneer House
 Terney House

Geography
Roscommon County is considered to be part of Northern Michigan. Part of Michigan's Au Sable State Forest falls within the county. The US Forest Service's Roscoe Fire Management Unit includes Ogemaw and Roscommon Counties.

Geographic features
During prehistoric times, glacial action helped shape the Michigan-area terrain. A large portion of the area is the Grayling outwash plain, which includes sandy ice-disintegration ridges; jack pine barrens, white pine-red pine forest, and northern hardwood forest. Large lakes were created by glacial action.

Prominent geographic features include:
 Au Sable River
 Backus Creek
 Cut River
 Dead Stream Flooding
 Higgins Lake
 Houghton Lake
 Houghton Lake Flats
 Lake St. Helen
 Marl Lake
 Roscommon Virgin Pine Stand – a  parcel within the Au Sable State Forest, 8 miles (13 km) north of St. Helen, Michigan, and 8 miles east of Roscommon. An old-growth stand of red pine, which includes a former national champion red pine.
 Underground oil deposits

Major highways
  (future)
  – runs south, SE, and east through the NE middle portion of county.
  – runs north–south through west portion of county. Passes on west side of Higgins and Houghton Lakes.
  – runs north–south through center of county. Passes Roscommon and Prudenville. Leaving Roscommon, runs east along north line of county for 5.6 miles (9 km) before turning to NE.
  – runs east–west through center of county to intersection with I75, 7 miles (11 km) west of east line of county.
  – short (1.1 mile/1.8 km) north-south spur connecting M18 to M55, east of Houghton Lake.
  – runs south from Prudenville. Exits the county on the line between Clare and Gladwin counties.

Airports
Houghton Lake State Airport is located in Roscommon Township.
Roscommon County–Blodgett Memorial Airport is located in Markey Township.

Adjacent counties

 Crawford County – north
 Oscoda County – northeast
 Ogemaw County – east
 Gladwin County – southeast
 Clare County – southwest
 Missaukee County – west
 Kalkaska County – northwest

Demographics

As of the 2000 United States Census, there were 25,469 people, 11,250 households, and 7,616 families residing in the county. The population density was 49 people per square mile (19/km2). There were 23,109 housing units at an average density of 44 per square mile (17/km2). The racial makeup of the county was 97.99% White, 0.32% Black or African American, 0.64% Native American, 0.19% Asian, 0.04% Pacific Islander, 0.10% from other races, and 0.72% from two or more races. 0.80% of the population were Hispanic or Latino of any race. 24.4% were of German, 12.7% English, 9.9% Irish, 9.2% Polish, 9.2% American and 6.7% French ancestry. 97.2% spoke English as their first language. Those citing "American" ancestry in Roscommon County are of overwhelmingly English extraction, however most English Americans identify simply as having American ancestry because their roots have been in North America for so long, in some cases since the 1600s.

There were 11,250 households, out of which 21.90% had children under the age of 18 living with them, 56.70% were married couples living together, 7.70% had a female householder with no husband present, and 32.30% were non-families. 28.10% of all households were made up of individuals, and 14.00% had someone living alone who was 65 years of age or older. The average household size was 2.23 and the average family size was 2.69.

The county population contained 20.00% under the age of 18, 5.50% from 18 to 24, 21.40% from 25 to 44, 29.30% from 45 to 64, and 23.80% who were 65 years of age or older. The median age was 47 years. For every 100 females there were 96.90 males. For every 100 females age 18 and over, there were 94.30 males.

The median income for a household in the county was $30,029, and the median income for a family was $35,757. Males had a median income of $31,878 versus $20,549 for females. The per capita income for the county was $17,837. About 8.60% of families and 12.40% of the population were below the poverty line, including 18.90% of those under age 18 and 6.50% of those age 65 or over.

Religion
 Roscommon County is part of the Roman Catholic Diocese of Gaylord.
 The Church of Jesus Christ of Latter-day Saints has one meetinghouse in the county, in Houghton Lake.
 Houghton Lake Wesleyan Church

Government
Roscommon County voters tend to vote Republican; they have selected the Republican Party nominee in 74% of national elections (25 of 34).

The county government operates the jail, maintains rural roads, operates the major local courts, records deeds, mortgages, and vital records, administers public health regulations, and participates with the state in the provision of social services. The county board of commissioners controls the budget and has limited authority to make laws or ordinances. In Michigan, most local government functions — police and fire, building and zoning, tax assessment, street maintenance, etc. — are the responsibility of individual cities and townships.

Elected officials

 Prosecuting Attorney: Mary Beebe
 Sheriff: Ed Stern
 County Clerk/Register of Deeds: Michelle Stevenson
 County Treasurer: Rebecca A. Ragan
 Drain Commissioner: Rex Wolfsen

(information as of January 2021)

Attractions and events
The community is centered in the area of two very large lakes, in the middle of large state forests. Wildlife are nearby, including bear, deer, eagles, Kirtland's warblers, and turkeys. Local attractions and activities include:
 Birding
 Bluegill Festival each summer in St. Helen
 Boating, paddling (canoe and kayak)
 Firemen's Memorial Festival, an annual event (September) since 1979.
 Fishing
 Golf
 Hiking
 Hunting
 Kirtland Warbler Habitat and Festival is an annual (held in May) event hosted by Kirtland Community College.
 Michigan Shore-to-Shore Trail, a 500-mile (800 km) system of interconnected trails, passes through the area. It runs from Empire to Oscoda, and points beyond.
 Nordic skiing
 ORV and groomed snowmobile trails
 Sailing
 Tip-up-town winter festival, Houghton Lake, an annual event (held in January).

Communities

Village
 Roscommon (county seat)

Civil townships

 Au Sable Township
 Backus Township
 Denton Township
 Gerrish Township
 Higgins Township
 Lake Township
 Lyon Township
 Markey Township
 Nester Township
 Richfield Township
 Roscommon Township

Census-designated places
 Houghton Lake
 Prudenville
 St. Helen

Other unincorporated communities

 Artesia Beach
 Au Sable River Park
 Geels
 Higgins Lake
 Hillcrest
 Houghton Lake Heights
 Houghton Point
 Keno
 Loxley
 Lyon Manor
 Maple Valley
 Meads Landing
 Michelson
 Nellsville
 Sharps Corner
 Tent City

See also
 List of counties in Michigan
 List of Michigan State Historic Sites in Roscommon County, Michigan
 National Register of Historic Places listings in Roscommon County, Michigan
 County Roscommon

References

External links

 Roscommon County
 Higgins Lake/Roscommon Chamber of Commerce
 Houghton Lake/Roscommon Chamber of Commerce
 
 A history of northern Michigan and its people Powers, Perry Francis. Chicago: Lewis Publishing Co., 1912. pp. 554–5
 History of Michigan. Moore, Charles. Chicago: Lewis Publishing Co., 1915. p. 709

 
Michigan counties
1875 establishments in Michigan
Populated places established in 1875